Colneis is a hundred of Suffolk, consisting of .

Running from the south-east outskirts of Ipswich to the North Sea coast, the hundred is made up of the land between the estuaries of the rivers Orwell and Deben. It lies within the Colneis Deanery, in the Archdeaconry of Suffolk.

Listed as Colneyse in the Domesday Book, the origin of the name is not known for sure, though the suffix -ness, meaning "headland" seems probable. The col may be the old name of the Deben before its renaming after Debenham.

The name survives as that of a Junior School in Felixstowe.

Parishes

Colneis Hundred consists of the following 10 parishes:

References

Hundreds of Suffolk